Terry Shepherd was a former Grand Prix motorcycle road racer. His best season was in 1958 when he finished the year in eighth place in the 350cc world championship.

Terry died on 5 October 2012.

References
Terry Shepherd career statistics at MotoGP.com

Year of birth missing
British motorcycle racers
350cc World Championship riders
500cc World Championship riders
Isle of Man TT riders
Place of birth missing
2012 deaths